Carita Elisabeth Holmström (born 10 February 1954, in Helsinki) is a Finnish pianist, singer and songwriter. She has written and played jazz and classical music during her career. She also had a duo, Carita & Marianne, with Marianne "Maru" Nyman. She represented Finland in the Eurovision Song Contest 1974 with the song "Keep Me Warm", finishing 13th.

Discography 
We Are What We Do (1973)
Toinen levy (1974)
Two Faces (1980)
Aquamarin (1984)
Time of Growing (1990)
DUO! (1994)
Jos tänään tuntis' huomisen 1973–1974 (If Today Would Know Morrow) (2004)
My Diary of Songs (2010)

References

External links 
Carita Holmström on the Finnish National Eurovision Final 1974 

1954 births
Living people
Eurovision Song Contest entrants of 1974
Eurovision Song Contest entrants for Finland
20th-century Finnish women singers
Finnish pianists
Finnish women pianists
Finnish songwriters
Swedish-speaking Finns
21st-century pianists
20th-century women pianists